This is a timeline of the history of football on television in the UK.

1930s 

 1937
 16 September – The BBC makes the world's first television broadcast of a football match, a specially arranged local mirror match derby fixture between Arsenal and Arsenal reserves.
 1938
 30 April – The BBC broadcasts television coverage of the FA Cup for the first time.
 1939
 1 September – The BBC Television Service is suspended, owing to the imminent outbreak of the Second World War.

1940s 
 1940 to 1945
 No events due to television being closed for the duration of the Second World War.
 1946
 7 June – BBC Television broadcasts resume.
 19 October – The first live televised post-war football match is broadcast by the BBC. Twenty minutes of Barnet's home game against Wealdstone were televised in the first half and thirty five minutes of the second half before it became too dark.
 1947
 8 February – A non-final match of the FA Cup is broadcast for the first time when the BBC shows the fifth round match between Charlton Athletic and Blackburn Rovers.
 1948
 10 August – An evening kick-off and a match between two foreign teams is broadcast for the first time, as Sweden v Denmark in the semi-finals of the Olympic football tournament is shown live from Wembley. This is also the first time an international football tournament has been shown on television.
 13 August - Two full matches are shown live on the same day for the first time; the bronze medal play-off and then the final of the Olympic tournament, both at Wembley.
 1949
 30 November - The earliest live match from which some footage of the television coverage still exists, England v Italy at White Hart Lane.

1950s 
 1950
 No events.
 1951
 No events.
 1952
 No events.
 1953
 No events.
 1954
 16 June-4 July – The FIFA World Cup is broadcast by the BBC for the first time with selected matches shown live.
 1955
The 1955 Scottish Cup Final between Celtic and Clyde is the first final in Scotland to be televised live
 The start of the European Cup sees both the BBC and the newly launched ITV cover the new midweek tournament from the outset.
 1956
 No events.
 1957
 No events.
 1958
 8–29 June – A greater range of matches compared to 1954 are shown thanks to the new Eurovision Network. Live games were shown on both the BBC and ITV, which was covering a World Cup for the first time.
 1959
 No events.

1960s 

 1960
 ITV agrees a deal worth £150,000 with the Football League to screen 26 matches; the very first live league match was on Saturday 10 September 1960 between Blackpool and Bolton Wanderers at Bloomfield Road. The match kicked off at 6:50 pm with live coverage starting at 7:30pm under the title The Big Game. The game was played in front of a half-empty stadium. ITV withdraws from the deal after first Arsenal and then Tottenham Hotspur refused them permission to shoot at their matches against Newcastle United and Aston Villa respectively, and when the Football League demanded a dramatic increase in player appearance payments.

 1961
 No events.
 1962
 30 May-17 June – The 1962 World Cup in Chile is covered in delayed form by the BBC with film carried by air via the United States back to Britain. Matches are generally seen three days after they were played, though every match was covered by the BBC with commentary. ITV does not cover the tournament.
 22 September – ITV moves again into broadcasting football, albeit tentatively, when Anglia Television launches Match of the Week, which shows highlights of matches from around East Anglia. Shortly after, Tyne Tees Television in the North East of England begins broadcasting local matches under the title Shoot.

 1963
 No events.
 1964
 15 August – Scottish Television launches Scotsport Results to provide Scottish viewers with a round-up of the day's Scottish football. It is broadcast on Saturday teatimes at around 5pm during the football season.
 22 August – The first broadcast of the BBC's football television show Match of the Day. It is shown on the recently launched BBC Two.
 1965
 22 August – Football highlights start to be shown in the Midlands following the launch by ATV launching Star Soccer in October 1965. Also at around the same time, other regions launched their own football highlights programmes, including Tyne Tees, ABC and Southern Television.
 1966
 11–30 July – The BBC and ITV jointly host coverage of the 1966 World Cup. This arrangement continues to this date for both the FIFA World Cup and the UEFA European Championship.
 1967
 No events.
 1968
 25 August – The first edition of The Big Match is broadcast. It is shown only in the London Weekend Television region as other ITV regions had their own shows, but they would show The Big Match if they were not covering games in their own region. 
 ITV launches On the Ball, a lunchtime preview of the day's football fixtures. It is shown as a segment within World of Sport.
 2 November – The first colour edition of Match of the Day is shown on BBC 2.
 1969
 Slow motion replays are introduced into the BBC's football coverage.

1970s 
 1970
 No events.
 1971
 No events.
 1972
 No events.
 1973
 26 September – Scottish and Grampian show live Coverage of a Scotland home international for the first time when they broadcast the World Cup Qualifier between Scotland and Czechoslovakia.
 17 October – ITV shows a home England international live from Wembley for the first time when it broadcasts the World Cup Qualifier between England v Poland. On the same night Scottish Television and Grampian Television show Scotland's away game to Czechoslovakia.
 1974
 August – Lunchtime preview show Football Focus launches. It is broadcast as a segment within Grandstand.
 1975
 9 August – Sportscene is broadcast for the first time, mainly to show highlights of Scottish football although the programme also covers other sports.
 16 August – The first edition of Scoreboard is shown on BBC One Scotland. It is an opt-out from Grandstand to provide fuller coverage of the day's Scottish football news.
 1976
 No events.
 1977
 No events.
 1978
 London Weekend Television audaciously wins exclusive rights to all league football coverage for ITV in a move termed Snatch of the Day. Although the Office of Fair Trading blocked the move, the BBC is forced to allow ITV to take over the Saturday night slot in alternating seasons, beginning with the 1980–81 season.
 1979
 No events.

1980s 
 1980
 No events.
 1981
 No events.
 1982
 No events.
 1983
 2 October – ITV shows a live top flight football match for the first time since 1960. This marks the start of English football being shown on a national basis rather than on a regional basis, resulting in The Big Match becoming a fully national programme. The BBC also shows five live matches that season, on Friday evenings. The first is on 28 October.
 1984
 No events.
 1985
 Domestic football in England is not shown on TV for the first half of the 1985–86 season.
 17 September – Screensport broadcasts the Football League Super Cup, a competition designed to compensate clubs banned from European competition following the Heysel Stadium disaster and at around the same time the channel starts broadcasting the Freight Rover Trophy.
 5 October – Following the demise of ITV's Saturday afternoon sports show World of Sport the previous week, its football preview show becomes a programme in its own right, called Saint & Greavsie, and a stand-alone results programme called Results Service is launched.
 1986
 11 January – Televised football returns in England when the BBC screens a live match from the third round of the FA Cup.
 20 April – The game between Hearts and Aberdeen is the first league match in Scotland to be televised live, broadcast by Scottish Television.
 16 August - The FA Charity Shield is shown live in its entirety for the first time.  ITV provide coverage of the match involving Everton and Liverpool.
 1987
 July – Screensport signs a deal with Thames Television, who were the Football League's agent for international distribution, to transmit 34 recorded matches via cable and satellite. Thames produced its programme, called the Big League Soccer. This resulted in Screensport being the only place where viewers could get extended highlights of the league during the 1987/88 season.
 1988
 14 May – The FA Cup Final is shown on both the BBC and ITV for the final time, thereby ending ITV's coverage of the competition until 1997.
 5 September – S4C launches a sports programme called Sgorio. The programme is set up to provide highlights of European football, including highlights of games from La Liga and Serie A, although other sports are also included within the programme.
 30 October – Following the signing of a new four-year deal to show exclusive live coverage of top flight English football, ITV begins showing a live game every Sunday afternoon.
 The BBC becomes the sole broadcaster of the FA Cup and Match of the Day, which now only broadcasts on Cup weekends, is renamed Match of the Day: The Road to Wembley.
 1989
 7 January – BBC Scotland launches an extended Saturday teatime results programme. Rather than opting out of the last few minutes of Grandstand, the programme, called Afternoon Sportscene, runs for the entire duration of the time allocated for the day's results, starting at some point between 1 and 5 minutes before the network aired English counterpart Final Score.
 11 August – Friday Sportscene launches as a Friday night preview of the weekend's Scottish football.

1990s 
 1990
 18 August – The Charity Shield is shown live on satellite television for the first time.  BSB's Sports Channel provides the coverage.
 November – For the first time, a live game from the first two rounds of the FA Cup is shown live. The games are broadcast by BSB's Sports Channel.
 1991
 No events.
 1992
 18 May – Sky outbids ITV for the live rights to the newly formed football Premier League. Sky bids £304 million, as opposed to ITV's £262 million.
 27 June – Due to ITV losing the rights to top flight football, Saint & Greavsie is broadcast for the final time following a decision by ITV to drop its Saturday football preview and results programmes. The final edition of Results Service had been shown a month earlier but Saint & Greavsie continued for an additional month so that the programme could cover Euro 92.  
 15 August – Sky Sports launches Sports Saturday. The programme follows the same format as the BBC's Grandstand programme featuring a mix of sporting action, concluding with the day's football results.
 16 August – To mark the start of Sky Sports's coverage of the Premier League, the channel launches an afternoon-long programme called Super Sunday. The programme concludes with a 90-minute football round-up called Scorelines.
 17 August – Monday Night Football makes its debut on Sky Sports as part of Sky's deal to show Premier League matches on Monday evenings. This is the first time that domestic football has been shown in the UK on Monday evenings.
 August – ITV maintains their partnership with the Football League and begins showing matches from the second tier of English football. The coverage is shown on a regional basis with many English regions showing a live game on a Sunday afternoon.
 6 September – The first edition of Football Italia is broadcast as part of Channel 4's deal to show Serie A. The channel continues to show Italian football for the next ten years. At its peak in the 1990s, Football Italia attracted over 3 million viewers, and remains the most watched programme in the UK about a non-British domestic football league.
 16 September – ITV shows its first matches from the newly formed UEFA Champions League, having purchased the rights following it being outbid for the rights to the Premier League.
 1993
 May – Scotsport Results is axed. It had provided Scottish Television viewers with a Saturday teatime football round-up for the past 29 seasons.
 1994
 18 May – The BBC shows the 1994 European Cup Final. This brings to an end the BBC's association with football's premier European clubs tournament which had dated back to when the competition began almost four decades earlier.
 17 June–17 July – Eurosport is the only channel which provides full coverage of the group stages of the 1994 FIFA World Cup due to the BBC and ITV opting to show only selected games in full from the group stages. This is the final time that the terrestrial broadcasts opt to only show selected live coverage of the World Cup.
 1995
 The first edition of Saturday morning football-based comedy/talk show Soccer AM is broadcast on Sky Sports.
 1996
 ITV loses the live rights to the Football League to Sky Sports. Consequently, ITV's main channel no longer shows domestic football on a live basis.
 16 August – Sky Sports 3 launches. The new channel becomes the showcase for Sky's coverage of the Football League. Sky Sports 3 also becomes the home to Sky's coverage of the Scottish Premier League. This is the first time that the SPL has been shown across the UK.
 1997
31 May – Even though Channel 5 had said that it hadn't been intending to show live sport at peak time, it buys the rights to one of England's qualifying matches for the 1998 World Cup – an away match against Poland. 
Autumn – Football on 5, which becomes a regular fixture as the channel purchases rights to UEFA Cup games and away qualifying matches involving the home nations, showing the former through the next decade.
 1998
 February – Middlesbrough Football Club launches Boro TV, and becomes the first football club in the world to launch their own dedicated TV channel.
 28 February – The 1998 Africa Cup of Nations Final between South Africa and Egypt is shown live on Channel 4. This is the first time that the tournament has been shown in the UK.
 15 August – On the first day of the 1998–99 football season, the first edition of Soccer Saturday is broadcast. This is the UK's first afternoon-long football scores service.
 5 September – ITV resurrects On the Ball, a lunchtime preview of the day's football fixtures. ITV also resurrects The Big Match as the title for its football coverage.
 10 September – MUTV launches.
 1 October – Sky Digital launches and this is marked by the launch of the UK's first rolling sports news channel Sky Sports News with football news a mainstay of the new service.
 7 December – ITV launches ITV2 and part of its schedule is devoted to additional football coverage. Among the output is a Saturday afternoon scores service called Football First. This is ITV's first football results programme for six years.
 1999
 September – Champions on 28 and Champions on 99 launch to provide live and recorded coverage of the UEFA Champions League. The channels are only available to ONdigital customers.

2000s 
 2000
 5–14 January – The BBC shows the inaugural FIFA Club World Cup. The Corporation shows live coverage of all matches on BBC Choice with Manchester United's matches and the final also being broadcast on BBC1.  The third place match was broadcast on BBC2.
 15 June – The latest contracts for football's Premier League are announced with the big news being that ITV has won the rights to the highlights package from the BBC at a reported cost of £183 million. Sky holds onto exclusive live coverage for another three seasons.
 September – ONsport launches. It replaces Champions on 28 and Champions on 99, which had reflected the channel numbers these were broadcast on. These channels were re-branded respectively as ONsport 1 and ONsport 2, after ONdigital had purchased rights to the ATP Masters Series tennis. Whilst ONsport 1 broadcasts 24 hours a day, ONsport 2 timeshared with Carlton Cinema and is only on air to provide coverage of an alternate Champions League match.
 2001
 30 May-10 June – Channel 5 broadcasts the FIFA Confederations Cup. Channel 5 also shows the next two tournaments.
 11 August – 
The ITV Sport Channel launches. It replaces ONsport. The new channel is mostly focussed on football and comes after ONdigital successfully outbid BSkyB for the rights to show live matches from The Football League and the League Cup, for a massive £315m over three seasons, at least five times more than any broadcaster had previously bid for it.
Football Focus and Final Score become programmes in their own right. Previously both had been a segment within Grandstand.
 13 August – Chelsea TV launches.
 18 August – 
PremPlus launches. The channel shows pay-per-view coverage of the Premier League, bringing pay-per-view football to the Uk for the first time. 
ITV begins its coverage of the Premier League when it launches its highlights programme The Premiership. The programme is shown in a primetime slot, airing at 7pm as opposed to the 10.30pm slot previously used by the BBC.  However ITV loses the rights to the rights to the FA Cup and the England football team return to the BBC with the Corporation showing live coverage of the national team for the first time in a decade.
 ITV relaunches its live scores service from Football First to The Goal Rush.
 September – The rights to the FA Cup and the England football team return to the BBC with the Corporation showing live coverage of the national team for the first time in a decade.
 17 November – Following disappointing viewing figures ITV ends its experiment with peak time Saturday night football and The Premiership reverts to the traditional 10.30pm slot.
 2002
 Channel 4 decides to call full time on a decade of showing Serie A.
 27 March – ITV Digital goes into administration with the cost of the Football League deal being the burden which used the company over the edge.
 12 May – Following the collapse of ITV Digital, the ITV Sports Channel stops broadcasting.
 August – Coverage of the Football League and the League Cup reverts to Sky Sports after a single season with ITV.
 Channel 5 buys the rights to the Scottish League Cup and shows the tournament for the next two seasons.
 2003
 May – ITV decides to stop showing a football scores service resulting in the demise of The Goal Rush.
 Sky Sports shows games from the UEFA Champions League for the first time.
 2004
 15 May – Following its loss of Premier League highlights, The Premiership is shown for the final time. Also, On the Ball is discontinued for the same reason.
 26 July – Celtic TV and Rangers TV launch.
 August – Football First launches on Sky Sports. The programme allows viewers to choose the game they want to watch.
 August – ITV launches a new regional football highlights programme Soccer Night. The programme focuses on Football League clubs, was introduced for the 2004–05 season to replace the long-standing Sunday afternoon highlights programmes owing to cutbacks at ITV plc. 
 August – Irish sports broadcaster Setanta Sports takes over from the BBC as the UK rights holder of the Scottish Premier League.
 14 August – To co-inside with the BBC regaining rights to highlights of the Premier League, BBC Sport launches an afternoon-long football scores service Score Interactive. The programme is broadcast from 14:30 until 18:00 on the BBC's interactive service, the BBC Red Button. The BBC had operated an in-vision scores service on Saturday afternoon the previous season.
 15 August – Match of the Day 2 launches to show highlights of Sunday Premier League matches. It is called MOTD2 due to it being shown on BBC Two.
2005
 22 May – Sky Sports shows the final of the 2004-05 FA Trophy, and goes on to show the next two finals.
 2006
 22 May – Sky launches its high definition service when Sky Sports 1 HD being broadcasting.
 August – The European Union objects to what it saw as a monopoly on television football rights and demands the 2007 contract be split into separate packages of 23 games. Consequently, Sky wins four of the six available packages, with the other two taken by Setanta Sports.
 25 August – Setanta Sports brings regular non league football to television when it acquires the rights to the Football Conference. The deal also sees the Conference Cup renamed the Setanta Cup.
 September – Bravo and Setanta Sports take over coverage of Serie A under a joint agreement from 2005 to the end of the 2006–07 season.
 2007
 6 May – PremPlus closes.
 May – After 15 seasons, Monday Night Football ends its first run due to Sky losing the rights to Monday evening Premiership matches to Setanta Sports.
 11 August – After the European Union objected to what it saw as a monopoly on Premier League television rights,  the 2007 contract was split into separate packages of 23 games in which at least one had to be sold to another broadcaster. Consequently, live Premier League matches are shown on a non Sky Sports channel for the first time when Setanta Sports shows the first of its 46 matches - wth Sky showing the remaining 92 television fixtures.
September – Five gains the rights to broadcast Serie A highlights and live games in the 2007–08 season. The show thus returned to terrestrial television and live games were shown weekly at 1:30pm UK time on Sundays, Coverage is shown under the name of Football Italiano.
 20 September – LFC TV, a dedicated official channel for English football club Liverpool F.C., launches.
 23 December – Bravo decides to drop its coverage of Serie A due to poor viewing figures. The league does continue to be shown by Setanta Sports.
 2008
 14 January – Arsenal TV launches.
 May – ITV's regional football highlights programme Soccer Night is axed as part of further cutbacks in ITV's regional output. The Welsh Soccer Sunday continued for a further six months with coverage of Cardiff City and Swansea City for the first half of the 2008/9 season but that programme was axed in December 2008. Goals from local Football League matches moved to ITV regional news programmes.
 17 May – Sky Sports shows FA Cup football for the final time, having covered the competition since BSB's Sports Channel launched in 1990.
 27 June – Five decides to end its coverage of Serie A after just a single season. The 2008/09 season is not shown in the UK, apart from a Milan derby which was shown by BBC Sport. ESPN picks up the rights beginning with the 2009/10 season.
 September – ITV resumes showing the FA Cup and the England football team. Consequently, the BBC has no rights to any form of coverage of the FA Cup for the very first time.
 2009
 22 June – It is announced that ESPN will take over the 46 games per season that were shown on Setanta Sports after Setanta failed to make a £10m payment to the rights holder which meant that the rights returned to the Premier League which allowed it to sell those rights to another broadcaster.
 23 June – Setanta Sports ceases broadcasting in the UK after going into administration. also stop broadcasting and from this date, football club channels Celtic TV and Rangers TV, which were sold as part of the Setanta package, close although both later return as online only channels. Arsenal TV does continue but closes just over a month later.
 4 August – ESPN launches in the UK, picking up many of the rights previously held by Setanta Sports. These include the rights to the Premier League that Setanta had held. It later dis many other football rights to its portfolio, including the Scottish Premier League, FA Cup, European club football and the Europa League
 Live coverage of the Football League returns to British terrestrial television when the BBC securing 10 live Championship (second tier) games per season, as well as Football League highlights after Match of the Day. This is the first time that the BBC had the rights to the Football League, and ITV had lost them, in the Premier League era.
 September – Channel 5 becomes the lead broadcaster of the UEFA Europa League meaning it can show the entire tournament, including the final. Previously it had only been able to show the early rounds due to the BBC or ITV having the rights from the quarter-finals onwards.

2010s
2010
 18 January – The BBC launches a regional football show to supplement its coverage of the Football League. Called Late Kick Off, the programmes follows a magazine-style format.
 August – 
Monday Night Football returns after Sky regains the rights to Monday night Premier League games.
 S4C beings showing a live match from the Welsh Premier League each Saturday afternoon. The live match replaces a weekly 30-minute highlights programme.
19 August – Premier Sports announces that it has bought the live and exclusive television rights to thirty matches per season from the Conference National for the next three seasons. The thirty matches selected for broadcast included all five Conference National play-offs.
2011
 8 January – The BBC launches a children's football magazine show Match of the Day Kickabout.
 13 April – ESPN shows the first of six matches from the newly formed FA Women's Super League.
2012
 9 May – Channel 5's fifteen years of showing Europe's second-tier football clubs competition ends when it shows live coverage of the 2012 UEFA Europa League Final. The primary rights transfer to ITV for the following three seasons with ESPN also broadcasting one match per round.
 12 June – The announcement of the rights to the Premier League for the next three seasons reveals that BT has won the rights to 38 matches each season. These rights are currently held by ESPN UK. The news followed speculation that ESPN was reconsidering its position in the UK.
 28 July – Football on 5 ends after the channel stops showing live football following the transfer of the UEFA Europa League to ITV. The last game to be shown is a pre-season friendly.
 August –  Match of the Day 2 moves to BBC One.
2013
 January – Eurosport takes over as broadcaster of Serie A, opting to show a match at peacetime whereas Channel 4 had shown its live coverage in the afternoon.
 BBC Two broadcasts four programmes covering the FA Women's Super League.
 August – BT Sport takes over as broadcaster of the Football Conference.
 1 August –  BT Sport launches.
 9 November – BT announces a £897 million deal with UEFA to broadcast the Champions League and Europa League exclusively on BT Sport from the 2015–16 season for three years. The deal will end two decades of the competition being broadcast free-to-air on ITV, although BT stated that the finals of both competitions and at least one match per season involving each participating British team would still be broadcast free-to-air.
2014
 12 August – Sky launches Sky Sports 5, primarily to broadcast European football. Among the events shown on the new channel are the Eredivisie.
 The BBC regains the rights to the FA Cup, which it shares with BT Sport. However ITV retains the contract to show live coverage of the England football team.
 Premier Sports brings the Belgian Pro League to British screens for the first time.
2015
 25 May – Following the loss of rights to the Football League to Channel 5, The Football League Show and Late Kick Off end after six seasons. The principal reason for losing the rights because the BBC screened the highlights late at night whereas Channel 5 offered to show them at 9pm.
 6 June – After 23 seasons, ITV's live broadcasting of the UEFA Champions League ends when it shows coverage of the 2015 UEFA Champions League Final. However it does continue to show highlights with all live coverage moving to BT Sport. 
 July – Premier Sports shows UEFA Champions League and UEFA Europa League qualifiers that include British teams. Premier Sports continues to show these early qualification matches to this day, with its coverage ending at the penultimate stage of qualifying.
 1 August – BT Sport launches a fourth channel – BT Sport Europe. The channel will be used to show its coverage of European football and European rugby union.
 2 August – BT Sport broadcasts the FA Community Shield for the first time.
 8 August – Football returns to Channel 5 when it takes over the contract to broadcast highlights of the Football League and the League Cup. It launches two new programmes under the revived Football on 5 banner. They are called The Championship and The Goal Rush. The programmes are broadcast from 9pm on Saturday evening.
 September – BT Sport becomes the exclusive broadcaster of both of UEFA's club competitions. Highlights continue to be shown on ITV. 
 Sky starts showing live coverage of Major League Soccer.
2016
 12 April – The Football Association confirms it has signed a new three-year contract with BT TV and the BBC to air coverage of the FA Cup, giving them the broadcasting rights to the competition until 2021. The deal will also see an increase in coverage of women's football by both broadcasters.
 22 May – BT Sport shows the finals of the FA Vase and FA Trophy as a double header. This builds upon BT's coverage of non league cup football as the previous year BT had shown the final of the FA Trophy.
 11 June – Premier Sports begins covering Copa América.
 2 August – Premier Sports becomes one of the rights holders to the newly expanded Scottish Challenge Cup. It broadcasts games alongside other rights holders BBC Alba and S4C. Previously, BBC Alba had been the sole broadcaster of the competition.
 4 August – BT Sport Europe is rebranded as BT Sport 3 so that it can show the full range of coverage from BT Sport.
 13 August – BT Sport launches its football scores programme BT Sport Score.
 19 August – Live Premier League football is shown on Friday evenings on a semi-regular basis for the first time as part of the new broadcasting deal. It is the first of ten games that Sky will broadcast on Friday evenings.
 25 August – The BBC launches a new Premier League magazine show called The Premier League Show.
2017
 18 July – Sky Sports is revamped with the numbered channels being replaced by sports-specific channels. These include two channels dedicated to football, a cricket channel and a golf channel. Other sports are moved to two new channels – Action and Arena – and a showcase channel called Sky Sports Main Event is launched which features simulcasts of the top events being shown on Sky Sports that day. Also, Sky Sports News drops the HQ label.
 September – 
 Sky shows the first of five matches a season from the NIFL Premiership.
 The BBC begins showing regular live coverage of the FA Women's Super League with a weekly game shown live on the BBC Red Button. BT Sport also provides regular live coverage of the FAWSL and does so until the end of the 2020/21 season.
2018
 14 February – BT and Sky have agreed a £4.4bn three-year deal to show live Premiership football matches from 2019 to 2022, but the amount falls short of the £5.1bn deal struck in 2015.
 6 May – Football League Tonight is broadcast for the final time, thereby ending Channel 5's three-year deal to show highlights of the English Football League.
 9 May – The final edition of The Premier League Show is broadcast.
 Sky's 20+ years of coverage of La Liga ends when the rights transfer to Eleven Sports. It also loses its rights to the Eredivise and the Chinese Super League  to the new channel.
 7 June – It is announced that Amazon Prime has been awarded the rights to livestream 20 Premier League matches a season for the next three seasons.
 August – 
BT Sport becomes the exclusive holder of all rights to the UEFA Champions League. The deal includes live coverage and highlights. Consequently, for the first time, there is no free-to-air coverage of the competition.
Eleven Sports UK and Ireland launches following deals with European football leagues. The platform is a streaming service rather than a television channel.
 8 August – EFL on Quest is broadcast for the first time following the transfer of the highlights rights to the English Football League to Quest.
 6 September – Sky Sports becomes the exclusive broadcaster of football's new UEFA Nations League tournament.
 November – Premier Sports announced a 6-year deal with the Scottish FA starting in 2019 to show the Scottish Cup. The exclusive live rights include the first 2 picks from rounds 4, last 16 and quarter-finals and first pick of a semi-final. There are also options to show matches in rounds 1–3 and the final and other semi-final non-exclusively with the BBC.
2019
 January – Just four months after going on air, Eleven Sports relinquishes most of its football rights, passing many of them onto Premier Sports.
 9 May – The BBC broadcasts the final edition of The Premier League Show is broadcast.
 30 June – After 18 seasons on air, Chelsea TV closes as a linear channel It continues as an on-line only service.
 3 December – Amazon Prime shows its first set of live Premier League football matches.
 8 December – BT Sport broadcasts the Scottish League Cup for the final time. The rights transfer to Premier Sports.

2020s
 2020
 13 January – Premier Sports launches La Liga TV, a full time channel showing  Spain's La Liga.
 February – FreeSports begins showing the Japanese J-league. 
 30 May – FreeSports begins showing the Polish Ekstraklasa and Danish Superliga.
 June – With the resumption of play in the 2019–20 Premier League due to the COVID-19 pandemic in the United Kingdom, the Premier League announces that it will show all remaining matches on British television, split primarily across Sky, BT, and Amazon. A large number of these matches are scheduled for free-to-air broadcasts, with Sky airing 25 on Pick, Amazon streaming its four matches on Twitch, and for the first time in league history, the BBC carries four live matches.
 16 June – Eurosport begins showing Norway's premier domestic football competition Eliteserien.  
 1 August – Sky Sports becomes the exclusive broadcaster of live coverage of the Scottish Professional Football League. In recent seasons Sky had shared the rights with BT Sport.
 8 September – It is announced that all of September's Premier League fixtures will be shown on TV due to fans not being into stadiums due to the COVID-19 pandemic.
 6 October – Premier Sports takes over from BT Sport as broadcaster of the Scottish League Cup.
 9 October – The Premier League announces that October's games not scheduled for TV broadcast will be shown on a pay-per-view basis on either Sky Sports Box Office or BT Sport Box Office. 
 13 November – The Premier League confirms that the broadcasting of matches via pay-per-view will end and that all games in December and January will be shown by either Sky Sports and BT Sport with one game also being shown on both Amazon Prime and the BBC and was later extended to cover the rest of the season.
 27 November – FreeSports begins showing matches from the 2020–21 Indian Super League season.
 2021
 January – BBC Sport shows South American football for the first time when it broadcasts the semi-finals and final of the 2020 Copa Libertadores.
 13 May – The Premier League announces that, for the first time, the next three-year broadcasting contact has been awarded without a bidding process. Consequently, the four rights holds - Sky Sports, BT Sport, Amazon Prime and BBC Sport - are paying the same amount for the same packages as they did for the 2019-2022 contact.
 13 June-10 July – The BBC shows 2021 Copa America. This is the first time that the tournament has been shown on free-to-air television. 
 7 August – After six years with BT Sport, the FA Community Shield returns to ITV Sport.
 13 August – Sky Sports replaces BT Sport as broadcaster of Germany's Bundesliga and Supercup.
 21 August – Serie A football returns to BT Sport after having been shown by other broadcasters since 2018. The new  deal sees BT Sport showing six matches per round for the next three seasons.
 3 September – Sky Sports replaces BT Sport as the pay-TV broadcast partner of the FA Women's Super League. Sky will show two figures per round - a total of 44 games/season - with some matches simulcast on Sky One, and the BBC will show one fixture of which 18 of their 22 games will be on BBC One or BBC Two.
 17 September – ITV broadcasts coverage of the England women's national football team for the first time.
 7 November – The FA Cup returns to ITV in a new deal with the BBC which sees the two broadcasters sharing the rights to the competition. This is the first time since 1988 that the competition has been shown fully and exclusively on terrestrial television, and it is the first time that ITV has broadcast the FA Cup since 2014.
 2022
 9 January – 6 February – The BBC and Sky Sports will share coverage of the African Cup of Nations. The BBC will show two quarter-finals, both semi-finals and the final live.
 9 February – Channel 4 broadcasts Chelsea's matches in the 2021 FIFA Club World Cup. This is the first time that Channel 4 has broadcast this event.
 11 April – BT Sport secures the rights to show live coverage of the Canadian Premier League.
 1 June – Premier Sports begins broadcasting Scotland, Wales Northern Ireland and Republic of Ireland UEFA Nations League matches until 2024. The deal also includes live rights to all other matches involving non-UK teams inc Spain, Germany, Italy and Portugal.
 4 June – Channel 4 begins sowing live coverage of the England men's football team, doing so for the first time as part of a two-year deal which will see Channel 4 broadcast England’s matches in the UEFA Nations League, European Qualifiers to UEFA Euro 2024 and International Friendlies.
 31 July – Highlights rights to the English Football League and the League Cup move to ITV after four years on Quest.
 21 August – ITV shows the first of ten games from this season's LaLiga.

See also
 English football on television
 Football in the United Kingdom
 Television in the United Kingdom
 Timeline of BBC Sport
 Timeline of ITV Sport
 Timeline of Sky Sports
 Timeline of BT Sport
 Timeline of other British sports channels

References

football on UK television
football on UK television
football on UK television
Sports television in the United Kingdom
football on UK television
English Football League on television
History of football in England